XHZIH-FM is a radio station on 90.5 FM in Zihuatanejo, Guerrero. It is owned by Radiorama and carries its Estéreo Vida format.

History
XHZIH received its concession on November 28, 1988.

References

Radio stations in Guerrero
Radio stations established in 1988